Van de Ende, van den Ende, van der Ende, Vander Ende are forms of a Dutch toponymic surnames, meaning "from the end" (of the street, village, etc.). It is most common in the province of South Holland. Notable people with the surname include:

Van den Ende
 Bjorn van den Ende (born 1986), Dutch rower
 Jan van den Ende (born 1954), Dutch organizational theorist
 Joop van den Ende (born 1942), Dutch media tycoon
 Walther van den Ende (born 1947), Belgian cinematographer

Van der Ende
Jacky van der Ende (born 1976), Dutch racing driver
Mario van der Ende (born 1956), Dutch football referee
Matt Vander Ende (born 1969), American drummer
Ricardo van der Ende (born 1979), Dutch racing driver
Ron van der Ende (born 1965), Dutch sculptor
Toos van der Ende (born ca 1946), Dutch rower

See also
Franciscus van den Enden (1602–1674), Flemish philosopher and teacher of Spinoza
Vander Ende-Onderdonk House, historic house in Ridgewood, Queens, New York

References

Dutch-language surnames
Surnames of Dutch origin